The 1901 All England Championships was a badminton tournament held at the Scottish Drill Hall, the headquarters of the London Scottish Rifles at Buckingham Gate, Westminster, London, England from 10–11 April 1901.

The men's and women's singles was first to 11 points (for a game) except the final which was first to 15 points. The holder Sydney Smith was defeated in his first match against the eventual winner H. W. Davies. The 1900 runner-up D. W. Oakes missed the event because he serving with his military regiment in India.

Final results

Men's singles

Women's singles

Men's doubles

Women's doubles

Mixed doubles

References

All England Open Badminton Championships
All England
All England Open Badminton Championships in London
All England Championships
All England Badminton Championships